801 Squadron may refer to

801 Naval Air Squadron, Fleet Air Arm squadron of the Royal Navy
801st Radar Squadron, United States Air Force unit
801st Aero Repair Squadron, now 107th Fighter Squadron

See also
 801 T.T.S. Airbats, a Japanese anime featuring the eponymous fictional 801 squadron
 801 (disambiguation)